= Fulani proverbs =

Folk proverbs of the Fulani ethnic group

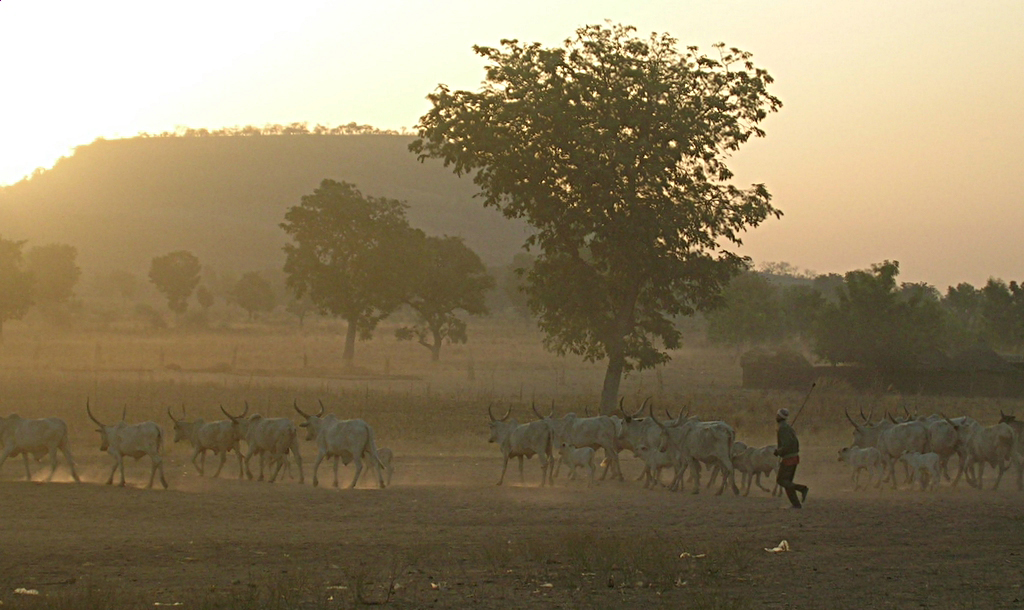
The Fulani are pastoral cattle herders and so one of their traditional proverbs is "If the cattle die, the Fulbe will die".

Fulani proverbs contain the folk wisdom of the Fulani people, expressed in their traditional sayings such as munyal deefan hayre ("patience can cook a stone").
